Gordonia humi is a Gram-positive and non-spore-forming bacterium from the genus Gordonia which has been isolated from soil near the mushroom Agaricus brasiliensis in Taiwan.

References

External links
Type strain of Gordonia humi at BacDive -  the Bacterial Diversity Metadatabase	

Mycobacteriales
Bacteria described in 2011